The Körös-ér (Hungarian, also Kőrös-patak), Kireš or Kereš, is a river in southern Hungary and northern Serbia, a  right tributary to the Tisa river.

Hungary 
The Körös-ér springs in the Hungarian part of the Subotička Peščara, between the towns of Jánoshalma and Kiskunhalas. It flows to the southeast, more as a series of connected bogs and less as a real river, without almost any settlements on its banks. West of the village of Kelebia, the Körös-ér becomes a border river between Hungary and Serbia.

Serbia 
The Körös-ér flows on the northern border of Subotica proper, close to its neighboring settlements (most notably, Šupljak) and the Ludoš lake. Near the village of Velebit, Kereš flows through the marshy area of Kapetanski Rit.

For some time the municipal government of Kanjiža (to which the mouth of the river belongs) protests about the extreme pollution of the Kereš's water, as it represents the single largest polluter of the Tisa river. Local politicians point at the city government of Subotica, which dumps its waste into the river, as the major culprit for such a bad condition of the river.

The river is neither channeled nor navigable.

History 
The first known source that presents the river, together with its portions drawn on map, dates back to 1694 from count Marsigli, who uses the Latinism "Kiris".

Wildlife 

Körös-ér flows through the northern section of the Ludaš Lake. The Serbian-German project "Ekolakus" for fishing out the invasive Prussian carp from the nearby Lake Palić lasted from 2019 to October 2022. As Prussian carp almost exterminated indigenous fish species in the lake, as they were fished out, the number of local fish species significantly grew, partially thanks to the restocking. By 2022, via Krvavo Lake and canals which connect it to the Ludaš Lake, and further into the Körös-ér, northern pike and zander spread into the river. The protected species of weatherfish also appeared in Körös-ér.

See also 
Rivers of Hungary
Rivers of Serbia

References

External links 
Kőrös/Kireš in Serbia

Rivers of Hungary
Rivers of Serbia
Geography of Vojvodina
Bačka
International rivers of Europe
Hungary–Serbia border
Border rivers